The 1951 Cork Senior Football Championship was the 63rd staging of the Cork Senior Football Championship since its establishment by the Cork County Board in 1887.

Garda entered the championship as the defending champions.

On 21 October 1951, Collins won the championship following a 2-03 to 1-05 defeat of St. Nicholas' in the final at the Cork Athletic Grounds. This was their third championship title overall and their first title since 1949.

Results

Final

References

Cork Senior Football Championship